General elections were held in San Marino on 8 September 1974. The Sammarinese Christian Democratic Party remained the largest party, winning 25 of the 60 seats in the Grand and General Council.

Electoral system
Voters had to be citizens of San Marino and at least 24 years old. This was the first election in San Marino with passive suffrage for women.

Results

References

San Marino
General elections in San Marino
General
San Marino